Susur Lee (born December 1958) is a Canadian celebrity chef based in Toronto, Ontario, Canada.

Culinary career 

Susur was born in Hong Kong, the youngest of six children. He served his culinary apprenticeship at Hong Kong's renowned Peninsula Hotel. He immigrated to Canada in 1978 and met and married his first wife, Marilou Covey, the same year. In 1983, Susur and Marilou had decided to move to Hong Kong, but Marilou died as a passenger aboard Korean Air Lines Flight 007 that was destroyed by a Soviet jet fighter. Susur married Brenda Bent in 1991, with whom he has three children: Kai, Levi, and Jet.

Susur worked his way to executive chef status at a number of restaurants and eventually became an entrepreneur. His eclectic culinary style is described as fusion cuisine. He is especially well known for "Singapore Slaw", his take on a Lo Hei salad, which is traditionally eaten during the Chinese New Year.

Susur was a finalist in the second season of the Bravo TV show Top Chef: Masters, finishing in a tie for second behind winner Marcus Samuelsson. He has made guest appearances on numerous television cooking shows, and was the second Canadian chef (after Rob Feenie) to appear on the Food Network's Iron Chef America.

Susur's career includes being a chef at numerous Toronto dining establishments, judging culinary events, appearing on many food and wine television shows and owning/managing popular restaurants in Canada, United States and Singapore. Lotus, his first restaurant, opened in Toronto in 1987. He currently owns and manages Susur Lee Restaurant Group.

Awards 

Susur's awards include the prestigious CAA Five Diamond Award, Cannes, France; the American Academy of Hospitality Services' 5 Diamond Award (selected as one of the "World's Best Chefs") and being named one of the "Ten Chefs of the Millennium" by Food & Wine. In 2017 he was given "Canada's Best 100 Lifetime Achievement Award". In 2015, Susur was one of the recipients of the 2015 Top 25 Canadian Immigrant Awards presented by Canadian Immigrant Magazine.

Current restaurants

 Lee, Toronto (owner and chef), 2004 – present
 Tung Lok Heen (formerly Chinois), Singapore (owner and chef), 2010–present
 Lee Kitchen, Toronto Pearson International Airport, 2015–present
 Kid Lee, Toronto (owner and chef), 2018–2020

Past restaurant affiliations
 Luckee, Toronto (owner and chef), 2014–December 2018
 Fring's, Toronto (co-owner rapper Drake), 2015–2018
 Bent, Toronto (owner and chef), 2012–2017
 Zentan at the Donovan House, Washington, D.C. (owner and chef), 2009–2013
 Shang, New York (owner and chef), 2008–2011
 Madeline's, Toronto (owner and chef), 2008–2010
 Susur, Toronto (owner and chef), 2000–2008
 Prague Fine Food Emporium, Toronto, 1998
 Ritz-Carlton, Singapore (consulting chef), 1997
 Kojis Kaizen, Montreal
 Hemispheres, Toronto (consulting chef)
 Oceans, 1990
 Lotus, Toronto (owner and chef), 1987-1997
 La Bastille, Toronto (guest chef), 1987
 Lela, Toronto (chef or executive chef)
 Peter Pan, Toronto (chef or executive chef)
 Le Trou Normand, Toronto
 Le Connaisseur, Toronto
 The Westbury Hotel, Toronto (cook)
 Peninsula Hotel, Hong Kong (apprentice/commis)

Book
 A Culinary Life, co-written with Canadian Chef Jacob Richler. Published by Ten Speed Press.

TV appearances
Iron Chef Canada - Iron Chef
Chopped Canada - guest judge
Top Chef Canada - guest judge
Top Chef - guest judge
Top Chef Masters - finalist (runner-up)
At the Table With... - biography on Susur's career
East Meets West - guest judge
Food Jammers - guest appearance in "Global Dumpling" episode
Iron Chef America - tied chef Bobby Flay in "Battle Bacon"
Opening Soon - Lee Restaurant
Restaurant Makeover - Dhaba Indian Excellence
Simply Ming - guest chef in the "Hoisin Sauce and Pizza Dough" episode
This Is Daniel Cook
Bizarre Foods America
MasterChef Asia - guest judge
Wall of Chefs - judge

Controversy
In 2007, the Ontario Ministry of Labour investigated six claims of unpaid wages from former employees at Lee's Susur restaurant on King Street West in Toronto that also included complaints of excessive work hours, failure to provide employees with due time off, and various other employment standards and human rights violations.

In April 2017, Fring's Restaurant in Toronto, co-owned by Lee and rapper Drake, had its liquor license suspended for a week by the Alcohol and Gaming Commission of Ontario. The establishment was cited for numerous Liquor Control and Fire Protection and Prevention violations, including overcrowding, promoting "immoderate consumption", and failing to post its license.

In August 2017, prior occurrences of employees at Lee's Toronto restaurants — Lee, Fring's, and Bent — having their tips docked to pay for spilled drinks, errors, and unpaid guest checks, an illegal business practice in Ontario, were revealed via screenshots on a pseudonymous Twitter account known for calling out personalities in the Toronto food scene. As a result, representatives for the chef have announced the policy is no longer in effect. Still, a petition was launched demanding the chef and his restaurants reinstate the money that was withheld. After more than 7,000 customers petitioned Lee, he and his sons, Kai Bent-Lee and Levi Bent-Lee, who help to manage the family business, announced that they would refund all retained gratuities to current and past staff.

References

External links
 Susur Lee - Chef and Restaurant Database

1958 births
Living people
Businesspeople from Toronto
Canadian restaurateurs
Canadian television chefs
Canadian writers of Asian descent
Hong Kong emigrants to Canada
Participants in Canadian reality television series
Writers from Toronto
Canadian cookbook writers
Canadian male chefs
Chefs from Toronto